The 1968 United States Senate election in Oklahoma was held November 3, 1968. Incumbent Democratic U.S. Senator Mike Monroney was running for re-election to a fourth term, but was defeated by Republican Henry Bellmon.

Major candidates

Democratic
Mike Monroney, Incumbent U.S. Senator

Republican
Henry Bellmon, Former Governor

Results

See also 
 1968 United States Senate elections

References

1968 Oklahoma elections
Oklahoma
1968